Acacia effusifolia is a shrub or tree belonging to the genus Acacia and the subgenus Juliflorae. It is native to an area in the Mid West and the Wheatbelt regions of Western Australia.

Description
The grey to brown coloured bark is mostly smooth but can occasionally be fissured toward the base. The new shoots tend to be encrusted in resin and have a few red glandular hairlets while the resin ribbed branchlets are hairy between the ribs. Like most species of Acacia it has phyllodes rather than true leaves. It mostly blooms between July and September producing yellow coloured flowers.

Distribution
The bulk of the population is found from around Mullewa to the south west with its range extending north to around Meekatharra and east out as far as Goongarrie with several outlying populations. It is usually situated on low hills, around granite outcrops, flats and sandplains where it grows in sandy or loamy soils that can contain a substantial amount of clay as a part of shrubland and spinifex communities that usually contain a number of Eucalyptus and other Acacia species.

See also
List of Acacia species

References

effusifolia
Acacias of Western Australia
Plants described in 2008
Taxa named by Bruce Maslin